Rajnarayan Mishra was an Indian socialist and freedom fighter of Indian Independence movement.
He gets the last execution of British rule at 9 December 1944.
The East India Company built Willoughby Memorial Hall in 1924 in memory of Sir Robert William Douglas Willoughby, Deputy Commissioner of Kheri who was killed on 26 August 1920. The colonial authorities apprehended independence activists Naseeruddin Mauzi Nagar and Rajnarayan Mishra on charges of shooting the Deputy Commissioner, and sentenced them to death by hanging. On 26 April 1936, Willoughby Memorial Library was established. The Willoughby Memorial Hall was recently renamed the Naseeruddin Memorial Hall.

References 

People from Lakhimpur Kheri
Revolutionary movement for Indian independence
Indian revolutionaries
Executed revolutionaries
Executed Indian people
People executed by British India by hanging
People executed for murdering police officers